The solderability of a substrate is a measure of the ease with which a soldered joint can be made to that material. Good solderability requires wetting (low contact angle) of the substrate by the solder.



Of metals

Solderability varies depending on the type of solder alloy under discussion. The discussion that follows applies only to unspecified electronic solders (which may include solders that contain lead, now banned for use in nearly all electronic equipment made or sold in the EU). Solderability when using lead-free alloys can differ significantly from solderability when using lead based alloys.

Noble metals may be easy to solder but they have brittle joints. The metals in the good category require a large amount of heat therefore oxidation is an issue. To overcome this a flux is required. For carbon steel, low alloy steel, zinc, and nickel the presence of sulfur creates a brittle joint; lower temperatures are used to minimize this problem. The oxides on the surface of aluminium cause wetting issues and special solders must be used to prevent galvanic corrosion issues. Stainless steel and high alloy steel have a low solderability because the chromium alloying element creates oxides that require aggressive fluxes. The only way that the final category of metals can be soldered is by pre-plating them in a metal that is solderable.

Testing solderability
Both quantitative and qualitative tests for solderability exist.
The two most common testing methods are the 'dip and look' method and wetting balance analysis. In both of these tests, the soldered pieces undergo an accelerated aging process before being tested for solderability, to take into consideration the time a component was in storage prior to mounting to final assembly. The dip and look method is a qualitative test. One form of it is specified as Mil-Std-883 Method 2003. On the other hand, the wetting balance analysis is a quantitative test that measures the wetting forces between molten solder and the test surface as a function of time.

References

Soldering